Urswick is a civil parish in the South Lakeland District of Cumbria, England. It contains eleven listed buildings that are recorded in the National Heritage List for England. Of these, one is listed at Grade I, the highest of the three grades, and the others are at Grade II, the lowest grade.  The parish contains the villages of Great Urswick, Little Urswick, Bardsea, and Stainton with Adgarley, and is otherwise rural.  The listed buildings consist of houses, two churches, a monument and a sundial in a churchyard, and a monument on a hilltop, 


Key

Buildings

References

Citations

Sources

Lists of listed buildings in Cumbria